Ion Nicolae Cuțelaba (born 14 December 1993) is a Moldovan professional mixed martial artist who competes in the Light Heavyweight division of the Ultimate Fighting Championship.

Background
Born and raised in Chișinău, Cuțelaba began training and competing in Greco-Roman wrestling as an adolescent. He additionally competed in Sambo and judo, becoming a national champion in both. In 2012, representing Moldova, Cuțelaba finished first in the 90 kg category of the European Sambo Championships.

Mixed martial arts career

Early career
Cuțelaba made his professional debut in April 2012, competing primarily for regional promotions across Eastern Europe. He amassed a record of 11-1 (1) before signing with the UFC in the spring of 2016.

Ultimate Fighting Championship

2016
Cuțelaba made his promotional debut against Misha Cirkunov on June 18, 2016 at UFC Fight Night 89. He lost the fight via submission in the third round.

Cuțelaba next faced Jonathan Wilson on October 1, 2016 at UFC Fight Night 96. He won the fight via unanimous decision.

Cuțelaba next faced Jared Cannonier on December 3, 2016 at The Ultimate Fighter 24 Finale. He lost the fight via unanimous decision. Subsequently, both fighters earned Fight of the Night honors.

2017
Cuțelaba faced Henrique da Silva on June 11, 2017 at UFC Fight Night 110. He won the fight via knockout in the opening minute of the first round.

Cuțelaba was expected to face Gadzhimurad Antigulov on November 4, 2017 at UFC 217. However, Antigulov pulled out of the fight on September 26 citing an injury and was replaced by newcomer Michał Oleksiejczuk. In turn after the weigh-ins, Cuțelaba was pulled from the event by USADA due to a potential Anti-Doping Policy violation stemming from its investigation into voluntary disclosures by Cuțelaba during an out-of-competition sample collections on October 18 and October 19. He was provisionally suspended and the bout was scrapped. USADA handed down a six-month suspension for ozone therapy involving  a blood transfusion which is prohibited under  2018 World Anti-Doping Agency (WADA) list on manipulation of blood component. Cuțelaba became eligible to fight again on May 6, 2018.

2018
The bout with Antigulov eventually took place on July 28, 2018 at UFC on Fox 30. Cuțelaba won the fight via TKO in the first round.

2019
Cuțelaba was scheduled to face Glover Teixeira on January 19, 2019 at UFC Fight Night 143. However, on January 10, 2019, Cuțelaba was pulled out of the bout due to an injury. The pair was rescheduled to meet at UFC Fight Night: Jacaré vs. Hermansson on April 27, 2019. Cuțelaba lost via a rear-naked-choke submission at 3:37 in the second round.

Cuțelaba faced Khalil Rountree Jr. on September 28, 2019 at UFC Fight Night 160. He won via TKO in the first round.

2020
Cuțelaba faced Magomed Ankalaev on February 29, 2020 at UFC Fight Night 169. He lost the fight via TKO in the first round. The loss was controversial as referee Kevin MacDonald stopped the bout believing Cuțelaba was out on his feet after a flurry of strikes from Ankalaev, which Cuțelaba immediately protested. The stoppage was heavily criticized by media outlets, fighters, and fans as being premature. Cuțelaba appealed the loss, which was subsequently denied by the Virginia athletic commission.

Due to the controversy of the stoppage, the UFC rebooked the pair on April 18, 2020 to meet at UFC 249. However, Ankalaev was forced to withdraw from the event due to COVID-19 pandemic travel restriction, with Cuțelaba being rescheduled to face Ovince Saint Preux on April 25, 2020. However, on April 9, UFC president Dana White announced that the event was postponed to a future date The rematch with Ankalaev was  expected to take place on August 15, 2020 at UFC 252. Cuțelaba then pulled out on August 11 after testing positive for COVID-19 and the bout was rescheduled for UFC Fight Night 175. However, the day of the event, the bout was once again scrapped after Cuțelaba tested positive for COVID-19 for a second time. The bout rescheduled for the third time and they met on October 24, 2020 at UFC 254. Cuțelaba lost the fight via knockout in round one.

2021
Cuțelaba was scheduled to face Devin Clark on May 1, 2021 at UFC on ESPN: Reyes vs. Procházka. However, Clark pulled out from the event, citing injury, and he was replaced by Dustin Jacoby. Cuțelaba dominated the first round, however Jacoby came back in the second and third rounds with the fight ending in a split draw.

The bout between Cuțelaba and Clark took place on September 18, 2021 at UFC Fight Night 192. Cuțelaba knocked down Clark in round one, going on to dominate the bout and won by unanimous decision.

2022 
Cuțelaba was scheduled to face Ryan Spann  on February 26, 2022 at UFC Fight Night 202. However, Spann was pulled from the event due to injury  and the bout was rescheduled for UFC on ESPN 36. He lost the bout via guillotine choke in the first round.

Cuțelaba faced Johnny Walker on September 10, 2022 at UFC 279. He lost the fight by a rear-naked choke submission in the first round.

Cuțelaba faced  Kennedy Nzechukwu on November 19, 2022, at UFC Fight Night 215. He lost the fight via technical knockout in round two.

2023 
Cutelaba is scheduled to face Tanner Boser on April 15, 2023, at UFC on ESPN 44.

Personal life
Ion and his wife Olga have two daughters.

Championships and accomplishments

Mixed martial arts
Ultimate Fighting Championship
Fight of the Night (One time)

Sambo
European Combat Sambo Federation
2012 European Combat Sambo Championships  (90 kg)

Mixed martial arts record

|-
|Loss
|align=center|16–9–1 (1)
|Kennedy Nzechukwu
|TKO (knee and punches)
|UFC Fight Night: Nzechukwu vs. Cuțelaba
|
|align=center|2
|align=center|1:02
||Las Vegas, Nevada, United States
|
|-
|Loss
|align=center|16–8–1 (1)
|Johnny Walker
|Submission (rear-naked choke)
|UFC 279
|
|align=center|1
|align=center|4:37
|Las Vegas, Nevada, United States
|
|-
|Loss
|align=center|16–7–1 (1)
|Ryan Spann 
|Submission (guillotine choke)
|UFC on ESPN: Błachowicz vs. Rakić 
| 
|align=center|1
|align=center|2:22
|Las Vegas, Nevada, United States
|
|-
|Win
|align=center| 16–6–1 (1)
|Devin Clark
|Decision (unanimous)
|UFC Fight Night: Smith vs. Spann 
|
|align=center|3
|align=center|5:00
|Las Vegas, Nevada, United States
| 
|-
|Draw
|align=center| (1)
|Dustin Jacoby
|Draw (split)
|UFC on ESPN: Reyes vs. Procházka
|
|align=center|3
|align=center|5:00
|Las Vegas, Nevada, United States
|
|-
|Loss
|align=center|15–6 (1)
|Magomed Ankalaev
|KO (punches)
|UFC 254
|
|align=center|1
|align=center|4:19
|Abu Dhabi, United Arab Emirates
|
|-
|Loss
|align=center|15–5 (1)
|Magomed Ankalaev
|TKO (head kicks and punches)
|UFC Fight Night: Benavidez vs. Figueiredo 
|
|align=center|1
|align=center|0:38
|Norfolk, Virginia, United States
|
|-
| Win
|align=center|15–4 (1)
|Khalil Rountree Jr.
|TKO (elbows)
|UFC Fight Night: Hermansson vs. Cannonier 
|
|align=center|1
|align=center|2:35
|Copenhagen, Denmark
|
|-
|Loss
|align=center|14–4 (1)
|Glover Teixeira
|Submission (rear-naked choke)
|UFC Fight Night: Jacaré vs. Hermansson 
|
|align=center|2
|align=center|3:37
|Sunrise, Florida, United States
|
|-
|Win
|align=center|14–3 (1)
|Gadzhimurad Antigulov
|TKO (punches and elbows)
|UFC on Fox: Alvarez vs. Poirier 2 
|
|align=center|1
|align=center|4:25
|Calgary, Alberta, Canada
|
|- 
|Win
|align=center|13–3 (1)
|Henrique da Silva
|KO (punches)
|UFC Fight Night: Lewis vs. Hunt
|
|align=center|1
|align=center|0:22
|Auckland, New Zealand
|
|-
|Loss
|align=center|12–3 (1)
|Jared Cannonier
|Decision (unanimous)
|The Ultimate Fighter: Tournament of Champions Finale 
|
|align=center|3
|align=center|5:00
|Las Vegas, Nevada, United States
|
|-
| Win
| align=center| 12–2 (1)
| Jonathan Wilson
| Decision (unanimous)
| UFC Fight Night: Lineker vs. Dodson
| 
| align=center| 3
| align=center| 5:00
| Portland, Oregon, United States
|
|-
| Loss
| align=center| 11–2 (1)
| Misha Cirkunov 
| Submission (arm-triangle choke)
| UFC Fight Night: MacDonald vs. Thompson
| 
| align=center| 3
| align=center| 1:22
| Ottawa, Ontario, Canada
|
|-
| Win
| align=center| 11–1 (1)
| Malik Merad
| KO (punch)
| WWFC: Cage Encounter 4
| 
| align=center| 1
| align=center| 0:08
| Paris, France
|
|-
| Win
| align=center| 10–1 (1)
| Vitali Ontishchenko
| Submission (omoplata)
| WWFC: Cage Encounter 3
| 
| align=center| 1
| align=center| 2:37
| Kyiv, Ukraine
| 
|-
| Win
| align=center| 9–1 (1)
| Yuri Gorbenko
| TKO (punches)
| WWFC: Ukraine Selection 5
| 
| align=center| 1
| align=center| 1:10
| Kyiv, Ukraine
| 
|-
| Win
| align=center| 8–1 (1)
| Izidor Bunea
| TKO (punches)
| WWFC: Cage Encounter 2
| 
| align=center| 1
| align=center| 1:13
| Chișinău, Moldova
| 
|-
| Win
| align=center| 7–1 (1)
| Alexandru Stoica
| KO (punch)
| WWFC: Cage Encounter 1
| 
| align=center| 1
| align=center| 0:07
| Chișinău, Moldova
| 
|-
| Win
| align=center| 6–1 (1)
| Constantin Padure
| KO (punch)
| CSA FC: Adrenaline
| 
| align=center| 1
| align=center| 1:05
| Chișinău, Moldova
| 
|-
| Win
| align=center| 5–1 (1)
| Igor Gorkun
| KO (punch)
| GEFC: Battle on the Gold Mountain
| 
| align=center| 1
| align=center| 0:28
| Uzhgorod, Ukraine
| 
|-
| Loss
| align=center| 4–1 (1)
| Michał Andryszak
| DQ (punches to back of head)
| CWFC 58
| 
| align=center| 1
| align=center| 4:07
| Grozny, Russia
|
|-
| NC
| align=center| 4–0 (1)
| Murod Hanturaev
| NC (referee error)
| Alash Pride: Grand Prix 2013
| 
| align=center| 1
| align=center| 0:24
| Almaty, Kazakhstan
|
|-
| Win
| align=center| 4–0
| Anatoli Ciumac
| TKO (punches)
| ECSF: Battle of Bessarabia
| 
| align=center| 2
| align=center| 0:29
| Chișinău, Moldova
| 
|-
| Win
| align=center| 3–0
| Igor Kukurudziak
| Submission (omoplata)
| ECSF: Adrenaline
| 
| align=center| 1
| align=center| 0:42
| Chișinău, Moldova
|
|-
| Win
| align=center| 2–0
| Julian Chilikov
| TKO (punches)
| The Battle For Ruse
| 
| align=center| 1
| align=center| 0:25
| Ruse, Bulgaria
| 
|-
| Win
| align=center| 1–0
| Daglar Gasimov
| TKO (punches)
| CIS: Cup
| 
| align=center| 1
| align=center| 0:27
| Nizhny Novgorod, Russia
| 
|-

See also
List of current UFC fighters
List of male mixed martial artists

References

External links
Official UFC Profile

1993 births
Living people
Light heavyweight mixed martial artists
Moldovan male mixed martial artists
Moldovan sambo practitioners
Moldovan male sport wrestlers
Moldovan male judoka
Mixed martial artists utilizing kickboxing
Mixed martial artists utilizing sambo
Mixed martial artists utilizing Greco-Roman wrestling
Mixed martial artists utilizing judo
Sportspeople from Chișinău
Ultimate Fighting Championship male fighters
20th-century Moldovan people
21st-century Moldovan people